Rainer Rothfuß (born 19 April 1971) is a German politician for the Alternative for Germany and member of the Bundestag from Bavaria.

Life and politics 

Rothfuß was born 1971 in the West German town of Freudenstadt and studied geography.
Rothfuß joined the AfD in 2018.

In the 2021 German federal election, he contested Oberallgäu but came in sixth place. He joined the Bundestag in 2023 following the death of Corinna Miazga.

References 

Living people
1971 births
21st-century German politicians
Members of the Bundestag
People from Freudenstadt
Members of the Bundestag 2021–2025
Members of the Bundestag for the Alternative for Germany
Members of the Bundestag for Bavaria